Silver Missiles and Nightingales is the first and only album by the collaboration between Andy McCoy and Nasty Suicide (under the moniker "The Suicide Twins"). The name of the album was originally supposed to be the title of Hanoi Rocks' (McCoy and Suicide's former band) 1984 album Two Steps From The Move, but the name was changed at the last minute.

When it was first released, Silver Missiles and Nightingales didn't fare well but the album's reception has since grown. The album is hailed as a great showcase of McCoy and Suicide's playing style and McCoy's writing talent. After the album's release, McCoy and Suicide (then known as Nasty Superstar) toured in Finland under the moniker "The Suicide Twins", until disbanding that same year (1986).

The song "The Best Is Yet to Come" was later covered by Samantha Fox.

Track listing
All track written by Andy McCoy, except where noted.

"Dance" - 4:26
"Heaven Made You" - 4:25  (McCoy, Dave Tregunna)
"Declaration" - 4:28 (McCoy, Anita Chellamah)
"Mainline Service" - 2:17
"What a Price to Pay" - 3:59
"Silver Missiles and Nightingales" - 3:59
"Coming Down Slow" - 3:23
"The Best Is Yet to Come" - 3:39
"Sweet Pretending" - 3:44 (McCoy, Dave Tregunna)
"Countryfield Inner City Blues" - 4:17

Personnel
Andy McCoy - vocals, guitar
Nasty Suicide (credited as Nasty Superstar) - vocals, guitar
René Berg - vocals
Ross Elder - drums

Additional musicians

 Patricia Morrison - bass on "Countryfield Inner City Blues"

References

1986 debut albums
The Suicide Twins albums